Ellen Maria Wade Colfax (July 26, 1836 – March 4, 1911) was the second wife of Schuyler Colfax, who became the first House speaker to be elected vice president when he ran on a ticket headed by Ulysses S. Grant in 1868. She was born in Andover, Ohio in 1836.

Biography
On November 18, 1868, just two weeks after the election, Ellen Maria Wade married the man who had defeated her uncle, Senator Benjamin Franklin Wade of Ohio, in the race for the Republican vice presidential nomination.  They had one son, Schuyler Colfax III, in April 1870.

Her husband, Schuyler Colfax was inaugurated as the 17th vice president on March 4, 1869, and served until March 4, 1873. Likewise, Ellen Maria Colfax became the second lady of the United States.

She died at her home in South Bend, Indiana in 1911 after a period of poor health, on the 42nd anniversary of her husband's assumption of the vice-presidency. She was survived by her son Schuyler Colfax III. Her funeral was held March 7, 1911, at the Colfax home, and she was buried next to her husband at South Bend City Cemetery.

References 

|-

1836 births
1911 deaths
Second ladies of the United States
19th-century American women
20th-century American women
Colfax family
Schuyler family
People from Andover, Ohio
Burials in Indiana